1933 marked a transitional year for the German film industry following the Nazi seizure of power and the beginnings of centralisation of the studios under the control of Joseph Goebbels' Ministry of Propaganda. A number of films faced censorship issues and several received only limited releases.

A–K

L–Z

Documentaries

Shorts

References

External links 
IMDB listing for German films made in 1933
filmportal.de listing for films made in 1933

German
Lists of German films
film